Eucalyptus litorea, commonly known as saline mallee, is a species of mallee that is endemic to a small area on the southern coast of Western Australia. It has hard, rough grey bark on the trunk, smooth grey bark above, lance-shaped adult leaves, flower buds in groups of seven, white flowers and cylindrical or barrel-shaped fruit.

Description
It has rough, hard, fissured bark on most or all of the trunk, smooth grey bark above.

Taxonomy and naming
Eucalyptus litoralis was first formally described in 1989 by Ian Brooker and Stephen Hopper from a specimen Brooker collected near Israelite Bay in 1984. The description was published in the journal Nuytsia. The specific epithet (litorea) is a Latin word meaning "pertaining to the "sea-shore", referring to the distribution of this species near the sea.

Distribution and habitat
Saline mallee is only known from near Israelite Bay where it is found on sand dunes and around salt lakes growing in calcareous sandy to loamy soils.

Conservation status
This eucalypt is classified as "Priority Two" by the Western Australian Government Department of Parks and Wildlife meaning that it is poorly known and from only one or a few locations.

See also
List of Eucalyptus species

References

litorea
Endemic flora of Western Australia
Mallees (habit)
Myrtales of Australia
Eucalypts of Western Australia
Goldfields-Esperance
Plants described in 1989
Taxa named by Ian Brooker
Taxa named by Stephen Hopper